This is a list of Green Arrow supporting characters.

In chronological order with name, first appearance and description.

Supporting characters

Alternate realities
Olivia Queen: Biological daughter of Oliver and Dinah Queen introduced in Kingdom Come #2 (June 1996).

In other media
In the TV series Smallville, Green Arrow would become one of Clark Kent's best friends, forming the Justice League and inspiring Kent towards his future as Superman. Arrow would eventually marry Chloe Sullivan.
As a member of Justice League Unlimited, Green Arrow became close friends with Supergirl.
In Batman: The Brave and the Bold, Green Arrow would become Batman's chief rival in the super hero community. He would eventually date Black Canary despite her initial crush with the Dark Knight.
For Young Justice, Arrow takes on Artemis as his sidekick when Speedy ended their partnership.
In the CW series Arrow, which debuted in 2012, Green Arrow works with a team of vigilantes. The team originates with Green Arrow, John Diggle and Felcity Smoak, and incorporates at various points over the series run Roy Harper/Arsenal, Sara Lance/White Canary, Thea Queen/Speedy, Laurel Lance/Black Canary, Curtis Holt/Mister Terrific, Rene Ramirez/Wild Dog, Rory Regan/Ragman, Evelyn Sharp/Artemis and Dinah Drake/Black Canary. His son William Clayton is also introduced. Green Arrow goes on to marry Felicity Smoak, and the pair have a daughter, Mia Smoak/Blackstar. The series originated the Arrowverse franchise, which sees Green Arrow working with other heroes including Barry Allen/The Flash and Kara Zor-El/Supergirl.

See also
 List of Green Arrow enemies
 List of Batman supporting characters
 List of Superman supporting characters
 List of Wonder Woman supporting characters
 List of Green Lantern supporting characters
 List of Aquaman supporting characters

References 

Lists of supporting characters in comics
Green Arrow